Black-ish is an American television sitcom broadcast on ABC created by Kenya Barris. The single-camera comedy centers on an upper-middle-class African-American family and premiered on September 24, 2014. On May 2, 2019, ABC renewed the series for a sixth season. On May 21, 2020, ABC renewed the series for a seventh season. On May 17, 2021, Black-ish was renewed for an eighth and final season.

Series overview

Episodes

Season 1 (2014–15)

Season 2 (2015–16)

Season 3 (2016–17)

Season 4 (2017–18)

Season 5 (2018–19)

Season 6 (2019–20)

Season 7 (2020–21)

Season 8 (2022)

Special

Ratings

Notes

See also
 List of Grown-ish episodes
 List of Mixed-ish episodes

References

Black-ish
Episodes